Trechus gwiomarchi is a species of ground beetle in the subfamily Trechinae. It was described by Morvan in 1982.

References

gwiomarchi
Beetles described in 1982